

Events

January 

 January 1 – The International Police Association (IPA) – the largest police organization in the world – is formed.
 January 5 – Sverdlovsk plane crash: Aeroflot Lisunov Li-2 crashes in a snowstorm. All 19 aboard are killed, including almost the entire national ice hockey team (VVS Moscow) of the Soviet Air Force – 11 players, as well as a team doctor and a masseur.
 January 6 – The UK recognizes the People's Republic of China; the Republic of China severs diplomatic relations with Britain in response.
 January 7 – A fire in the St Elizabeth's Ward of Mercy Hospital in Davenport, Iowa, United States, kills 41 patients.
 January 9 – The Israeli government recognizes the People's Republic of China.

 January 12 – Submarine  collides with Swedish oil tanker Divina in the Thames Estuary and sinks; 64 die.
 January 13 – Finland forms diplomatic relations with the People's Republic of China.
 January 21 – In the United States, suspected spy Alger Hiss is convicted on two counts of perjury.
 January 23 – The Knesset passes a resolution that states Jerusalem is the capital of Israel.
 January 24 – Cold War: Klaus Fuchs, German émigré and physicist, confesses to an MI5 interrogator that he is a Soviet spy: for seven years, he passed top secret data on U.S. and British nuclear weapons research to the Soviet Union. Fuchs is formally charged on February 2.
 January 26 – India promulgates its constitution, forming a republic, and Rajendra Prasad is sworn in as its first president. The Kingdom of Mysore is merged into the new republic.
 January 31
 United States President Harry S. Truman orders the development of the hydrogen bomb, in response to the detonation of the Soviet Union's first atomic bomb in 1949.
 The last Kuomintang troops surrender in mainland China.

February 

 February 1 – Chiang Kai-shek is re-elected as president of the Republic of China.
 February 6
In West Virginia, 372,000 coal miners strike (they remain out until March 3).
 The first Cabinet Secretary (N.R. Pillai) is appointed in India.
 February 8
 The Stasi is founded in East Germany, and acts as a secret police until 1990. 
 A payment is first made by Diners Club card, in New York, United States (the first use of a charge card).
 February 11
 Two Viet Minh battalions attack a French base in French Indochina.
 Finland recognizes Indonesia.
 February 12
 The European Broadcasting Union is founded.
 Albert Einstein warns that nuclear war could lead to mutual destruction.
 February 13 – British Columbia B-36 crash: The U.S. Air Force loses a Convair B-36 bomber that carried a Mark 4 nuclear bomb off the west coast of Canada, and produces the world's first Broken Arrow.
 February 14 – Cold War:
 The Soviet Union and the People's Republic of China sign a mutual defense treaty (terminated in 1979).
 In an election speech at Edinburgh, Winston Churchill proposes "a parley at the summit" with Soviet leaders, the first use of the term "summit" for such a meeting.
 February 15 – Juho Kusti Paasikivi is re-elected president of Finland.
 February 19 – Konrad Adenauer tries unsuccessfully to negotiate with East Germany, to begin unification.
 February 21 – Cunard liner Aquitania arrives at the scrapyard in Faslane at the end of a 36-year career, the longest of any in the 20th Century.
 February 23 – 1950 United Kingdom general election: The Labour Party, led by Clement Attlee, remains in office, but the Tories, led by Winston Churchill, increase their seats in the House of Commons.

March 

 March 1
 Klaus Fuchs is convicted in London of spying against both Britain and the United States for the Soviet Union, by giving to the latter top secret atomic bomb data.
 Acting Chinese President Li Tsung-jen ends his term in office.
 Chiang Kai-shek resumes his duties as Chinese president, after moving his government to Taipei, Taiwan.
 March 3 – Poland indicates its intention to exile all Germans.  
 March 8 – The first Volkswagen Type 2 (also known as the Microbus) rolls off the assembly line in Wolfsburg, Germany.
 March 12 – A plane carrying returning rugby fans from Ireland to Wales crashes near Llandow, with the loss of 80 lives.
 March 13 – Royal Question: Belgian monarchy referendum, 1950 – In Belgium, the referendum over the monarchy shows 57.7% support the return of King Leopold III, 42.3% against.
 March 18 – The Belgian government collapses, after the March 12 referendum favouring of the return from exile of King Leopold III.
 March 20 – The Polish government enacts a law to take possession of properties owned by Roman Catholic churches.
 March 22 – Egypt demands that Britain remove all its troops in the Suez Canal.
 March 23 – The 22nd Academy Awards Ceremony is held.

April 

 April 14 – Influential British comic Eagle is launched.
 April 15 – Belgian King Leopold III announces that he is ready to abdicate in favor of his son, Baudouin.
 April 24 – Jordan formally annexes the West Bank.
 April 27
 Apartheid: In South Africa, the Group Areas Act is passed, formally segregating the races.
 Britain formally recognises Israel.

May 

 May 1 – UNRWA, the United Nations Relief and Works Agency for Palestine Refugees in the Near East, begins operations.
 May 5 – Bhumibol Adulyadej (Rama IX), king of Thailand since 1946, is crowned, at The Grand Palace in Bangkok.
 May 6
 Cazin rebellion in Bosnia against Communist agrarian reforms.
 Tollund Man is unearthed in Denmark.
 May 9 – Robert Schuman presents his proposal for the creation of a pan-European organisation, which he believes to be indispensable to the maintenance of permanently peaceful relations between the different nations of the continent. This proposal, known as the "Schuman Declaration", is considered to be the beginning of the creation of what is now the European Union.
 May 11 – The Kefauver Committee hearings into U.S. organized crime begin.
 May 13 – The first race in the inaugural FIA Formula One World Championship in automobile racing is held, at Silverstone, England.
 May 14 – The Huntsville Times runs the headline "Dr. von Braun Says Rocket Flights Possible to Moon."
 May 17 – Israeli Air Force Spitfires intercept a Royal Air Force Short Sunderland when it inadvertently crosses into Israeli airspace, forcing it to land at Lod Airport. The Sunderland's crew have been issued maps that do not depict Israel, as Britain had not recognized the Jewish state at the time they were issued.
 May 22
 Celâl Bayar becomes the third president of Turkey.
 Adnan Menderes of the DP forms the new government of Turkey (19th government).
 May 24 – The United States Maritime Administration is formed (under the Department of Commerce).
 May 25 – The Brooklyn–Battery Tunnel is formally opened to traffic in New York City.
 May 29 
 St. Roch, the first ship to circumnavigate North America, arrives in Halifax, Nova Scotia.
 The pilot series of the world's longest-running radio soap opera, The Archers, is first broadcast on BBC Light Programme in the U.K.

June 

 June 1–23 – Mauna Loa in Hawaii starts erupting.
 June 3 – Maurice Herzog and Louis Lachenal, of the French Annapurna expedition, become the first climbers to reach the summit of an 8,000-metre peak.
 June 6 – Turkey: The Adhan in Arabic is permitted by law after a ban of 18 years.
 June 8 – Sir Thomas Blamey becomes the only Field Marshal in Australian history.
 June 16 – Maracana Stadium, which becomes a well-known sports venue of Brazil, opens in Rio de Janeiro, in advance of the opening of the 1950 FIFA World Cup in the country on June 24.
 June 25 – The Korean War begins: Troops and T-34 tanks of the North Korean People's Army cross the 38th parallel into South Korea.
 June 26 – The Parliament of South Africa passes the Suppression of Communism Act.
 June 27 – Korean War: U.S. President Harry S. Truman orders American military forces to aid in the defense of South Korea.
 June 28 – Korean War:
 North Korean forces capture Seoul, but do not win the war.
 Hangang Bridge bombing: The South Korean army, in an attempt to defend Seoul, blows up the Hangang Bridge while it is crowded with refugees.
 Seoul National University Hospital massacre: North Korean troops kill around 800 medical staff and patients.
 Bodo League massacre begins: South Korean armed forces and police summarily execute at least 100,000 suspected North Korean sympathizers.

July 

 July 14–21 – Korean War – Battle of Taejon: North Korean forces capture the city held by the U.S. 24th Infantry Division, but the delay allows establishment of the Pusan Perimeter.
 July 16 – Uruguay beats Brazil 2–1, to win the 1950 World Cup.
 July 17 – The Suppression of Communism Act (passed on June 26) comes into force in South Africa.
 July 20 – After a month-long campaign, the majority of North Korea's Air Force was destroyed by anti-communist forces. 
 July 30 – 4 workers striking over the "Royal Question" in Belgium are shot dead by the Gendarmerie, at Grâce-Berleur near Liège.

August 

 August 5
 2 Squadron SAAF departs, to take part in the Korean War.
 1950 Fairfield-Suisun Boeing B-29 crash: A bomb-laden Boeing B-29 Superfortress crashes into a residential area in California, United States, killing 17 people and injuring 68.
 August 6 – Monarchist demonstrations lead to a riot in Brussels.
 August 8
 Florence Chadwick swims across the English Channel in 13 hours, 22 minutes.
 Winston Churchill supports idea of a pan-European army, allied with Canada and the U.S.
 August 12
 Korean War: Bloody Gulch massacre.
 In his encyclical Humani generis, Pope Pius XII declares evolution to be a serious hypothesis, that does not contradict essential Catholic teachings.
 August 15 – The 8.6  Assam–Tibet earthquake shakes the region, with a maximum Mercalli intensity of XI (Extreme), killing between 1,500 and 3,300 people. 
 August 17 – Korean War – Hill 303 massacre: 39 U.S. soldiers are executed, after being captured in battle by North Korea.
 August 22 
 France announces the introduction of a government-guaranteed minimum wage.
 The Immaculate Heart of Mary Seminary is founded in Tagbilaran City, Philippines.
 August 23 – Legendary singer-actor Paul Robeson, whose passport had recently been revoked because of his alleged Communist affiliations, meets with U.S. officials in an effort to get it reinstated. He is unsuccessful, and it is not reinstated until 1958.

September 

 September 3 – Italian racing driver Giuseppe Farina becomes the first winner of the FIA Formula One World Championship, being the only driver to win the championship in his home country.
 September 7 – The Knockshinnoch Disaster in Scotland kills 13 coal miners; 116 are rescued.
 September 15 – Korean War – Battle of Inchon: Allied troops commanded by Douglas MacArthur land in Inchon, occupied by North Korea, to begin a U.N. counteroffensive.
 September 18 – Rede Tupi, the first television broadcast network in South America, is founded in Brazil.
 September 19 
 West Germany decides to purge communist officials.
 Korean War: An attack by North Korean forces was repelled at the Battle of Nam River.
 September 26 – Indonesia is admitted to the United Nations.

October 

 Turing test published.
 October 3 – Getúlio Vargas is elected president of Brazil for a 5-year term.
 October 5 – The Indonesian government quells riots in the Moluccas.
 October 7
 Battle of Chamdo: The Annexation of Tibet by the People's Republic of China, begins with the Chinese People's Liberation Army invading across the Jinsha River. By October 19 they will have taken the border town of Chamdo, and the Tibetan army will have surrendered.
 The Agate Pass Bridge opens for traffic in Washington State.
 October 9 – The Goyang Geumjeong Cave massacre begins in South Korea.
 October 11 – The Federal Communications Commission in the United States issues the first license to broadcast television in color, to CBS (RCA will successfully dispute and block the license from taking effect, however).
 October 19 – Korean War: The People's Republic of China enters the conflict, by sending thousands of soldiers across the Yalu River.
 October 20 – Australia passes the Communist Party Dissolution Act, which is later struck down by the High Court.
 October 28 – Torcida Split is founded, in support of the Association football club HNK Hajduk Split, in SFR Yugoslavia.
 October 29 – Upon the death of Gustaf V of Sweden, he is succeeded as king by his 68-year-old son Gustaf VI Adolf.
 October 30 – The Jayuya Uprising is started by Puerto Rican Nationalists, against the United States-supported government.

November 

 November 1
 Pope Pius XII witnesses the "Miracle of the Sun" at the Vatican and defines a new dogma of Roman Catholicism, the Munificentissimus Deus, which says that God took Mary's body into Heaven after her death (the "Assumption of the Blessed Virgin Mary").
 Puerto Rican nationalists Griselio Torresola and Oscar Collazo attempt to assassinate U.S. President Harry S. Truman, who is staying at the Blair-Lee House in Washington, D.C. during White House repairs.
 November 4 – The United Nations ends the diplomatic isolation of Spain.
 November 8 – Korean War: While in an F-80, United States Air Force Lt. Russell J. Brown intercepts 2 North Korean MiG-15s near the Yalu River and shoots them down, in the first jet-to-jet dogfight in history.
 November 10 – A U.S. Air Force B-50 Superfortress bomber, experiencing an in-flight emergency, jettisons and detonates a Mark 4 nuclear bomb over Quebec, Canada (the device lacks its plutonium core).
 November 13
 The President of Venezuela, Colonel Carlos Delgado Chalbaud, is kidnapped and murdered in Caracas.
 A Curtiss Reid Flying Services plane crashes while en route to Paris from Rome, killing all 52 on board.
 November 17 – Tenzin Gyatso, 15, is formally enthroned as the 14th Dalai Lama, becoming temporal ruler of Tibet.
 November 18 – The United Nations accepts the formation of the Libyan National Council.
 November 24 – A phenomenal winter storm ravages the northeastern United States, brings 30–50 inches of snow and temperatures below zero, and kills 323 people.
 November 26 – Korean War: Troops from the People's Republic of China launch a massive counterattack against South Korean and United Nations forces at the Ch'ongch'on River and the Chosin Reservoir, dashing any hopes for a quick end to the conflict.
 November 28
 The Colombo Plan for Co-operative Economic Development in South and South-East Asia comes into effect.
 Greece and Yugoslavia reform diplomatic relations.
 November 29 – The National Council of the Churches of Christ in the USA is founded.
 November 30 – Douglas MacArthur threatens to use nuclear weapons in Korea.

December 

 December 2 – Korean War: The Battle of the Ch'ongch'on River ends with the Chinese People's Volunteer Army expelling United Nations forces from North Korea. 
 December 31 – The inaugural 12 Hours of Sebring automobile endurance race is held in Florida.

Date unknown 
 Canadians Harry Wasylyk, Larry Hansen and Frank Plomp introduce the plastic bin bag, for garbage collection.
 Myxomatosis is introduced into Australia, in an attempt to control the escalating rabbit population.
 IBM Israel begins operating in Tel Aviv.
 President Harry Truman sends United States military advisers to Vietnam, to aid French forces.
 Knox's Translation of the Vulgate Old Testament (commissioned by the Catholic Church) is published.
 Laos gets involved in the First Indochina War, to overthrow the French Army.
 Raid Pyrénéen, a French timed bicycle challenge since 1950.
 In the summer of 1950, the first newspaper for the Romanian minority in modern Hungary, Foaia Românească ("The Romanian Sheet"), is founded.

Births

January 

 January 1 – Wayne Bennett, Australian rugby league player and coach
 January 3
 Victoria Principal, American actress (Dallas)
 Vesna Vulović, Serbian flight attendant and world-record holding plane crash survivor (d. 2016) 
 January 7
 Juan Gabriel, Mexican singer, songwriter and philanthropist (d. 2016)
 Erin Gray, American actress 
 January 9 – Alec Jeffreys, British geneticist, who developed techniques for DNA fingerprinting and DNA profiling
 January 12 – Dorrit Moussaieff, Israeli-born British businesswoman; First Lady of Iceland 2003-2016
 January 14 – Jagadguru Rāmabhadrācārya, Hindu religious leader
 January 16 
 Debbie Allen, African-American actress, dancer, and choreographer
 Honey Irani, Indian film actress and screenwriter 
 Luis López Nieves, Puerto Rican writer
 January 18 – Gilles Villeneuve, Canadian race car driver (d. 1982)
 January 21 – Billy Ocean, Trinidadian–British singer
 January 23 – Richard Dean Anderson, American actor (MacGyver)
 January 24
 Daniel Auteuil, French actor
 Gennifer Flowers, American actress, connected to Bill Clinton
 January 26 – Jörg Haider, Austrian politician (d. 2008)
 January 29
 Ann Jillian, American actress
 Jody Scheckter, South African racing driver
 Miklós Vámos, Hungarian writer, screenwriter

February

 February 1 – Kazimierz Nycz, Polish clergyman
 February 3 – Morgan Fairchild, American actress (Flamingo Road)
 February 6 – Natalie Cole, African-American singer (d. 2015)
 February 7 – Karen Joy Fowler, American author
 February 10
 Luis Donaldo Colosio, Mexican politician and economist, assassinated while campaigning for President of Mexico (d. 1994)
 Mark Spitz, American Olympic swimmer
 February 12
 Michael Ironside, Canadian actor (V)
 João W. Nery, Brazilian writer and LGBT activist (died 2018)
 February 13 – Peter Gabriel, English rock musician, original lead singer of Genesis
 February 15 – Tsui Hark, Hong Kong film director
 February 16 – Peter Hain, Kenyan-born British politician
 February 18
 Nana Amba Eyiaba I, Ghanaian queen mother and advocate
 John Hughes, American film director, producer and writer (d. 2009)
 Cybill Shepherd, American actress (The Last Picture Show)
 February 21
 Larry Drake, American actor, voice artist, and comedian (d. 2016)
 Sahle-Work Zewde, President of Ethiopia
 February 22
 Julius Erving, African-American basketball player
 Awn Al-Khasawneh, Prime Minister of Jordan
 Miou-Miou, French actress
 Julie Walters, English actress 
 February 24 – George Thorogood, American musician
 February 25
 Neil Jordan, Irish film director, writer and producer
 Néstor Kirchner, 49th President of Argentina (d. 2010)
 February 26 – Helen Clark, Prime Minister of New Zealand
 February 27 – Azean Irdawaty, Malaysian actress, singer (d. 2013)
 February 28 – Jaime Fabregas, Filipino actor

March

 
 March 1 – Phil Alden Robinson, American film director 
 March 2 – Karen Carpenter, American singer and drummer (d. 1983)
 March 4 – Rick Perry, American politician, 14th U.S. Secretary of Energy, 47th Governor of Texas
 March 9 – Danny Sullivan, American race car driver
 March 10
 Carlos Roberto Flores, President of Honduras
 Catherine Pugh, Democrat politician, 50th mayor of Baltimore and criminal
 March 11
 Bobby McFerrin, African-American singer (Don't Worry, Be Happy)
 Jerry Zucker, American film producer, director and writer
 March 12 – Javier Clemente, Spanish football player, manager
 March 13
Robert Brandom, American philosopher
William H. Macy, American actor
 Charles Krauthammer, American conservative political commentator (d. 2018)
 March 18 – Brad Dourif, American actor
 March 20 – William Hurt, American actor (d. 2022)
 March 21 – Sergey Lavrov, current Foreign Minister of Russia
 March 22 
 Hugo Egon Balder, German actor, television presenter
 Jocky Wilson, Scottish darts player (d. 2012)
 March 26
 Teddy Pendergrass, African-American singer (d. 2010)
 Martin Short, Canadian-born comedian (Saturday Night Live)
 Alan Silvestri, American composer, conductor 
 March 27 – Maria Ewing, American operatic soprano (d. 2022)
 March 29
 Kulsoom Nawaz, Pakistani politician (d. 2018) 
 Mory Kanté, Guinean musician (d. 2020)
 March 30 – Robbie Coltrane, Scottish actor and comedian (d. 2022)

April

 April 1 – Samuel Alito, Associate Justice of the Supreme Court of the United States
 April 4 – Christine Lahti, American actress
 April 5
 Agnetha Fältskog, Swedish pop singer, songwriter (ABBA)
 Harpo, Swedish pop musician
 Paul Oscher, American blues singer-songwriter
 April 6 – Tan Aik Mong, Malaysian badminton player (d. 2020)
 April 8 – Grzegorz Lato, Polish footballer
 April 11 – Bill Irwin, American actor
 April 12
 Joyce Banda, née Mtila, 4th President of Malawi
 David Cassidy, American actor and singer (d. 2017)
 April 13
 Ron Perlman, American television, film, stage, and voice actor
 Tommy Raudonikis, Australian rugby league player and coach (d. 2021)
 April 14 
 Francis Collins, American physician
 Péter Esterházy, Hungarian writer (d. 2016)
 April 15 − Josiane Balasko, French actress, writer and director
 April 18 − Kenny Ortega, American filmmaker, touring manager, and choreographer
 April 20 − N. Chandrababu Naidu, Indian politician, 13th Chief Minister of Andhra Pradesh
 April 22 
 Peter Frampton, English rock musician  
 Thierry Zéno, Belgian filmmaker
 April 26 
 Liz Chase, Zimbabwean field hockey player (d. 2018)
 Susana Higuchi, Peruvian politician (d.2021)
 April 28 – Jay Leno, American comedian and talk show host 
 April 29 – Paul Holmes, New Zealand radio and television broadcaster (d. 2013)

May

 May 5 – Googoosh, Iranian singer, actress
 May 6 – Jeffery Deaver, American crime writer
 May 7 – Tim Russert, American journalist (Meet the Press) (d. 2008)
 May 10 – Dale Wilson, Canadian voice actor
 May 11 – Sadashiv Amrapurkar, Indian actor (d. 2014)
 May 12 – Gabriel Byrne, Irish actor
 May 13
 Joe Johnston, American film director
 Danny Kirwan, British musician (d. 2018)
 Stevie Wonder, African-American musician
 May 14 – Jill Stein, American politician, activist, and 2016 Green Party presidential candidate
 May 15 – Renate Stecher, German athlete
 May 16 – Georg Bednorz, German physicist, Nobel Prize laureate
 May 17 – Janez Drnovšek, Slovenian politician, 2-time Prime Minister of Slovenia, 2nd President of Slovenia (d. 2008)
 May 18 
 Thomas Gottschalk, German radio, television host, entertainer and actor
 Mark Mothersbaugh, American composer, artist, and singer (Devo)
 May 29 – Frederick Sumaye, 7th Prime Minister of Tanzania

June

 June 3
 Melissa Mathison, American screenwriter (d. 2015)
 Suzi Quatro, American singer and songwriter
 Deniece Williams, African-American singer
 June 5 – Abraham Sarmiento, Jr., Filipino journalist, political activist (d. 1977)
 June 8 – Kathy Baker, American actress
 June 13 – Belinda Bauer, Australian actress
 June 14 – Rowan Williams, Archbishop of Canterbury
 June 15 – Lakshmi Mittal, Indian industrialist
 June 16 – Mithun Chakraborty, Indian actor, singer, producer, writer, social worker, entrepreneur
 June 19 – Ann Wilson, American singer, musician ((Heart))
 June 20 – Nouri al-Maliki, 74th Prime Minister of Iraq
 June 21
 Joey Kramer, American musician
 Vasilis Papakonstantinou, Greek singer and musician
 June 22
 Adrian Năstase, 59th Prime Minister of Romania
 Zenonas Petrauskas, Lithuanian lawyer, politician (d. 2009)
 June 24 – Nancy Allen, American actress
 June 25
 Nitza Saul, Israeli actress
 Marcello Toninelli, Italian writer
 June 26 – Jaak Joala, Estonian singer, musician (d. 2010) 
 June 29 – Simone Gbagbo, ICC criminal, former Ivorian politician and First Lady

July

 July 5 – Huey Lewis, American rock singer 
 July 9 – Viktor Yanukovych, President of Ukraine
 July 11 – Pervez Hoodbhoy, Pakistani nuclear physicist and social activist
 July 12 – Eric Carr, American rock drummer, musician (Kiss) (d. 1991)
 July 13
 Ma Ying-jeou, President of the Republic of China (Taiwan)
 Jurelang Zedkaia, 5th President of the Marshall Islands (d. 2015)
 July 14 – Chungsen Leung, Taiwanese-Canadian businessman, politician
 July 17
 Tengku Sulaiman Shah, Malaysian corporate figure
 Phoebe Snow, African-American singer-songwriter (d. 2011)
 Stevo Stepanovski, Macedonian bibliophile
 July 18
 Sir Richard Branson, British entrepreneur 
 Jack Layton, Canadian politician (d. 2011)
 July 19 – Per-Kristian Foss, Norwegian Minister of Finance
 July 26 – Susan George, British actress
 July 28 
 Soh Chin Aun, Malaysian footballer
 Sir Tapley Seaton, Kittitian politician, 4th Governor-General of Saint Kitts and Nevis
 July 29 – Jenny Holzer, American conceptual artist

August

 August 3 
 John Landis, American film director
 Ernesto Samper, 29th President of Colombia
 August 5 – Rosi Mittermaier, German ski racer (d. 2023)
 August 7 – Alan Keyes, African-American conservative political activist
 August 8 
 Lucjan Lis, Polish-German cyclist (d. 2015)
 Ken Kutaragi, Japanese businessman
 August 9 – Anémone, French actress, filmmaker and political activist (d. 2019)
 August 11
 Gennadiy Nikonov, Russian weapon designer (d. 2003)
 Steve Wozniak, American inventor, engineer, programmer, philanthropist, and entrepreneur
 August 12 – Iris Berben, German actress
 August 15
 Anne, Princess Royal, British royal, daughter of Elizabeth II and The Duke of Edinburgh
 Neil J. Gunther, Australian/American physicist, computer scientist
 August 16
 Hasely Crawford, West Indian athlete
 Marshall Manesh, Persian actor
 August 17 – Jose Apolinario Lozada Jr., Filipino diplomat, politician (d. 2018)
 August 19 – Sudha Murthy, Indian philanthropist and author
 August 22 – Scooter Libby, American conservative political adviser
 August 23 – Alan Tam, Hong Kong singer and actor
 August 27 – Charles Fleischer, American actor, stand-up comedian and voice artist

September

 September 1
 Mikhail Fradkov, Russian politician, Prime Minister of Russia (2004–2007)
 Phil McGraw, American TV psychologist
 September 7
 Johann Friedrich, German-Australian engineer, con man
 Julie Kavner, American actress and the voice of Marge Simpson
 September 8 – Mark Gable, Australian singer, songwriter (The Choirboys)
 September 14
 Paul Kossoff, British rock guitarist (Free) (d. 1976)
 Masami Kuwashima, Japanese racing driver 
 September 15 – Rajiv Malhotra, Indian-American author
 September 17 – Narendra Modi, Prime Minister of India
 September 21
 Charles Clarke, British politician
 Bill Murray, American actor and comedian 
 September 22 – Kirka Babitzin, Finnish singer (d. 2007)
 September 24
 Feng Ting-kuo, Taiwanese politician (d. 2018) 
 Kristina Wayborn, Swedish actress
 September 26 – Mohamed Tarabulsi, Lebanese weightlifter (d.2002)
 September 27 – Cary-Hiroyuki Tagawa, Japanese actor
 September 28 – Christina Hoff Sommers, American author and philosopher

October

 October 1 
 Boris Morukov, Russian astronaut (d. 2015)
 Randy Quaid, American actor, comedian
 October 3 – Phyllis Nelson, American singer (d. 1998)
 October 5 – Laura Gemser, Indonesian born-Dutch actress
 October 7 – Jakaya Kikwete, 4th President of Tanzania
 October 9 – Jody Williams, American teacher, aid worker and recipient of the Nobel Peace Prize
 October 10 – Nora Roberts, American novelist
 October 12
 Kaga Takeshi, Japanese actor
 Pilar Pilapil, Filipina actress
 Howard Rollins, American actor (d. 1996)
 October 16 – Angry Grandpa, American YouTuber (d. 2017)
 October 18 – Wendy Wasserstein, American playwright (d. 2006)
 October 19 – Bishop Bill Ray, 10th Bishop of North Queensland
 October 20 – Tom Petty, American rock singer (d. 2017)
 October 22 – Donald Ramotar, 8th President of Guyana
 October 25
 Walter Kwok, Hong Kong entrepreneur (d. 2018)
 Chris Norman, English singer (Smokie)
 October 28
 Annette Humpe, German singer (Ideal, Ich + Ich)
 Sihem Bensedrine, Tunisian human rights activist
 October 29
 Rino Gaetano, Italian musician and singer-songwriter (d. 1981)
 Abdullah Gül, 11th President of Turkey
 October 31 – John Candy, Canadian comedian, actor (d. 1994)

November

 November 1 – Robert B. Laughlin, American Nobel Prize laureate
 November 3
 Massimo Mongai, Italian author (d. 2016)
 Nayyara Noor, Pakistani playback singer (d. 2022)
 November 4
Charles Frazier, American novelist
Markie Post, American actress (d. 2021)
 November 9 – Maravillas Rojo, Catalan politician
 November 10 – Debra Hill, American producer (d. 2005)
 November 17 – Roland Matthes, German swimmer
 November 21 – Alberto Juantorena, Cuban athlete
 November 22 – Steven Van Zandt, American singer, songwriter, musician, producer, actor, and activist.
 November 23 – Chuck Schumer, American politician
 November 28
 Ed Harris, American actor and film director
 Russell Alan Hulse, American physicist, Nobel Prize laureate
 November 29 – Olavi Mäenpää, Finnish politician (d. 2018)

December

 December 1 
 Manju Bansal, Indian molecular biologist
 Themba Dlamini, 9th Prime Minister of Swaziland
 December 2
 Amin Saikal, Australian academic professor
 Benjamin Stora, French historian
 Paul Watson, Canadian-American founder of the Sea Shepherd Conservation Society
 December 5 – Camarón de la Isla, Spanish singer (d. 1992)
 December 7 – Hasanaga Sadigov, Azerbaijani ashik musician (d. 2018)
 December 9 – Joan Armatrading, St. Kitts-born English singer, songwriter
 December 12
 Heiner Flassbeck, German economist, professor, publicist, political counselor and State secretary
 Rajinikanth, Indian actor
 December 13 – Wendie Malick, American actress and former fashion model
 December 19 – Manny Trillo, Venezuelan-born American baseball player
 December 22 – María Antonieta de las Nieves, Mexican actress, comedian, and singer (La Chilindrina in El Chavo del Ocho)
 December 23 – Vicente del Bosque, Spanish footballer, manager
 December 25 – Yehuda Poliker, Israeli singer, songwriter, musician, and painter 
 December 30 – Safiya Henderson-Holmes, African-American poet (d. 2001)

Date unknown
 Koibla Djimasta, 7th Prime Minister of Chad (d. 2007)
 Joseph Yodoyman, 4th Prime Minister of Chad (d. 1993)

Deaths

January

 January 1 – William A. Griffin, American Roman Catholic prelate and reverend (b. 1885)
 January 2
 Emil Jannings, Swiss-born German actor (b. 1884)
 Anthony Prusinski, American politician (b. 1901)
 Theophrastos Sakellaridis, Greek composer, conductor (b. 1883)
 January 3 – Tess Gardella, Italian-born American actress, dancer (b. 1894)
 January 7 
 Monty Banks, Italian comedian, director (b. 1897)
 Alfonso Daniel Rodríguez Castelao, Spanish politician, writer, painter and doctor (b. 1886)
 Joseph, Duke of Parma (b. 1875)
 January 8 – Joseph Schumpeter, Czech economist, political scientist (b. 1883)
 January 11 – James A. Colescott, American Imperial Wizard of the Ku Klux Klan (b. 1897)
 January 12 – John M. Stahl, American film director, producer (b. 1886)
 January 13 – Gino Frittelli, Italian painter (b. 1879)
 January 14 – Ieu Koeus, 9th Prime Minister of Cambodia (b. 1905)
 January 15 – Henry H. Arnold, American general and aviation pioneer (b. 1886)
 January 16 – Ali Moustafa Mosharafa, Egyptian physicist (b. 1898)
 January 17 – Seiichi Hatano, Japanese philosopher (b. 1877)
 January 18 – Horace Rice, Australian tennis player (b. 1872)
 January 20 – Ray Duggan, Australian speedway rider (b. 1913)
 January 21 – George Orwell, British author (b. 1903)
 January 22 – Alan Hale Sr., American actor (b. 1892)
 January 23 – Vasil Kolarov, Bulgarian Communist politician, former provisional head of State and 33rd Prime Minister of Bulgaria (b. 1877)
 January 29 – Ahmad Al-Jaber Al-Sabah, Sheikh of Kuwait (b. 1885)

February

 February 3
 Sir Lionel Cripps, Rhodesian politician (b. 1863)
 Karl Seitz, Austrian politician, 1st President of Austria (b. 1869)
 February 6 – Georges Imbert, Alsatian chemist (b. 1884)
 February 7 
 D. K. Broster, British historical novelist (b. 1877)
 Masao Inoue, Japanese actor, director (b. 1881)
 William Murphy, American Roman Catholic clergyman, bishop and reverend (b. 1885)
 February 9
 Abdul Qadir, Indian editor (b. 1874)
 Franz Justus Rarkowski, German Roman Catholic bishop and reverend (b. 1873)
 Ted Theodore, Australian politician, Premier of Queensland (b. 1884)
 February 10 – Marcel Mauss, French sociologist (b. 1872)
 February 11 – Kiki Cuyler, American baseball player (Chicago Cubs), MLB Hall of Fame member (b. 1898)
 February 12 – Bernard Meninsky, Ukrainian-born British artist, painter, draughtsman and teacher (b. 1891)
 February 13 – Rafael Sabatini, Italian writer (b. 1875)
 February 14
 Cecilio Guzmán de Rojas, Bolivian painter (b. 1899)
 Karl Guthe Jansky, American physicist, radio engineer and father of radio astronomy (b. 1905)
 February 16 
 Johannes Hjelmslev, Danish mathematician (b. 1873)
 Mile-a-Minute Murphy, American cyclist (b. 1870)
 February 21 – Gerhard Kowalewski, German mathematician (b. 1876)
 February 23 – Piotr Śmietański, Polish executioner (b. 1899)
 February 25 
 Ignatius Arnoz, Czechoslovakian Roman Catholic prelate and reverend (b. 1885)
 George Minot, American physician, recipient of the Nobel Prize in Physiology or Medicine (b. 1885)
 February 26 – Harry Lauder, British entertainer (b. 1870)

March

 March 2 – Rosli Dhobi, Malay Sarawakian nationalist (b. 1932)
 March 4 – Anthony Holles, British actor (b. 1901)
 March 5
 Sid Grauman, American theatre entrepreneur (b. 1879)
 Edgar Lee Masters, American poet (b. 1868)
 March 6
 Albert Lebrun, French politician, 15th President of France (b. 1871)
 Harry Redfern, British architect (b. 1861)
 March 10 – Marguerite De La Motte, American actress (b. 1902)
 March 11 
 Ralph Freeman, British engineer (b. 1880)
 Heinrich Mann, German novelist (b. 1871)
 Brock Pemberton, American theatrical producer (b. 1885)
 March 15
 Alexander Kabiskoy, Soviet WWII heroine (b. 1920)
 Carl Storck, 3rd President of the National Football League (b. 1892)
 March 18 – Väinö Kivilinna, Finnish teacher, activist and politician (b. 1875)
 March 19
 Edgar Rice Burroughs, American author (Tarzan) (b. 1875)
 Sir Norman Haworth, British chemist, Nobel Prize laureate (b. 1883)
 Alexandru Vaida-Voevod, 28th Prime Minister of Romania (b. 1872)
 March 20 – Frederick Twort, English bacteriologist (b. 1877)
 March 21 – Katherine Grey, American actress (b. 1873)
 March 22 – Emmanuel Mounier, French philosopher (b. 1905)
 March 24 
 James Rudolph Garfield, American politician (b. 1865)
 Harold Laski, British political theorist, economist (b. 1893)
 March 25 
 Frank Buck, American animal collector (b. 1884)
 Frances Micklethwait, British chemist (b. 1867)
 March 27 – Solomone Ula Ata, Prime Minister of Tonga (b. 1883)
 March 30
 Léon Blum, French statesman, 2-time Prime Minister of France (b. 1872)
 Joe Yule, British entertainer, father of Mickey Rooney (b. 1894)

April

 April 1 
 F. O. Matthiessen, American historian, literary critic (b. 1902)
 Recep Peker, Turkish officer, politician and 6th Prime Minister of Turkey (b. 1889)
 April 3 – Kurt Weill, German-born composer (b. 1900)
 April 5 – Charles Binaggio, American gangster (b. 1909)
 April 7 – Walter Huston, Canadian-born American actor (b. 1883)
 April 8 – Vaslav Nijinsky, Soviet ballet dancer, choreographer (b. 1889)
 April 10 
 Fevzi Çakmak, Turkish military officer, statesman and Prime Minister of Turkey (b. 1876)
 Alfred Fischer, German architect (b. 1881)
 April 11 – Bainbridge Colby, United States Secretary of State (b. 1869)
 April 13
 Saleh al-Ali, Syrian revolt leader (b. 1884)
 James Morrison, Canadian Roman Catholic bishop and reverend (b. 1861)
 April 14 – Ramana Maharshi, Indian sage and jivanmukta (b. 1879)
 April 16 
 Henry J. Knauf, American politician (b. 1891)
 Arnaud Massy, French golfer (b. 1877)
 April 17 – Władysław Filipkowski, Polish military commander (b. 1892)
 April 23 
 Gemma Bellincioni, Italian soprano (b. 1864)
 Franciscus Janssens, Dutch Roman Catholic abbot and reverend (b. 1881)
 April 26 – George Murray Hulbert, American politician (b. 1881)
 April 27
 Hobart Cavanaugh, American character actor (b. 1886)
 Karel Koželuh, Czech tennis player (b. 1895)
 April 30 – Francesco Jovine, Italian writer, author (b. 1902)

May

 May 1 – Lothrop Stoddard, American eugenicist (b. 1883)
 May 6 – Víctor Manuel Román y Reyes, Nicaraguan politician, 23rd President of Nicaragua (b. 1872)
 May 7 – Gavrilo V, Serbian Patriarch (b. 1881)
 May 8 – Vital Brazil, Brazilian physician and immunologist (b. 1865)
 May 9 
 Harry Stubbs, British-born American actor (b. 1874)
 Esteban Terradas i Illa, Andorran mathematician, scientist and engineer (b. 1883)
 May 10 
 John Gould Fletcher, American poet (b. 1886)
 Belle da Costa Greene, American librarian, bibliographer and archivist (b. 1883)
 May 11 – Cedric Holland, British admiral (b. 1889)
 May 12 – Harold Basil Christian, South African-Rhodesian horticulturalist (b. 1871)
 May 18 – Henri Cihoski, Romanian general and politician (b. 1871)
 May 19 
 Giuseppe Garibaldi II, Italian soldier, patriot, revolutionary and grandson of Italian patriot Giuseppe Garibaldi (b. 1879)
 Giuseppina Suriano, Italian Roman Catholic nun and blessed (b. 1915)
 May 22 
 Andrew McDonald, British Roman Catholic clergyman, bishop and reverend (b. 1871)
 Alfonso Quiñónez Molina, 27th President of El Salvador (b. 1874)
 May 24 
 Isidore Ngei Ko Lat, Burmese catechist, Roman Catholic priest, martyr and blessed (killed in action) (b. 1918)
 Peter Petrovich Troyanskii, Soviet educator and scholar (b. 1894)
 Mario Vergara, Italian Roman Catholic priest, martyr and blessed (killed in action) (b. 1910)
 Archibald Wavell, 1st Earl Wavell, British field marshal (b. 1883)
 May 25 – Nicolae Ciupercă, Romanian general and politician (b. 1882)
 May 26 – Stanisław Kętrzyński, Polish historian, diplomat (b. 1878)
 May 28 – Vicente Sotto, Filipino politician (b. 1877)

June

 June 3 – Ahmad Tajuddin, Sultan of Brunei (b. 1913)
 June 4
 Carmen Baroja, Spanish writer, ethnologist (b. 1883)
 George Cecil Ives, German-born British poet, writer, penal reformer and early gay rights campaigner (b. 1867)
 Kazys Grinius, 3rd President of Lithuania (b. 1866)
 June 5 – Miklós Bánffy, Hungarian nobleman, politician and novelist (b. 1873)
 June 6 – William Wadsworth, American actor (b. 1874)
 June 9 – Denis Auguste Duchêne, French general (b. 1862)
 June 20 – Etsu Inagaki Sugimoto, Japanese autobiographer, novelist (b. 1874)
 June 22 – Jane Cowl, American actress (b. 1883)
 June 24 – Darwan Singh Negi, Indian Victoria Cross recipient (b. 1881)
 June 26 – Antonina Nezhdanova, Soviet soprano (b. 1873)
 June 27 
 Záviš Kalandra, Czechoslovak historian, theorist (b. 1902)
 Theophilus Pashkovsky, American Orthodox archbishop, metropolitan (b. 1874)
 June 28 – Archbishop Makarios II (b. 1870)
 June 29 – Melitta Bentz, German entrepreneur, who invented the coffee filter in 1908 (b. 1873)

July

 July 1 – Eliel Saarinen, Finnish architect (b. 1873)
 July 5 – Salvatore Giuliano, Italian bandit (b. 1922)
 July 7 – Fats Navarro, American jazz trumpet player (b. 1923)
 July 8 
 Helen Holmes, American actress (b. 1892)
 Othmar Spann, Austrian philosopher and economist (b. 1878)
 July 10 – Richard Maury, American naturalized Argentine engineer (b. 1882)
 July 11 – Buddy DeSylva, American songwriter (b. 1895)
 July 12
 Lev Galler, Soviet admiral (b. 1883)
 Elsie de Wolfe, American socialite and interior decorator (b. 1859)
 July 17 
 Evangeline Booth, 4th General of The Salvation Army (b. 1865)
 Antonie Nedošinská, Czechoslovakian actress (b. 1885)
 July 18 – Mignon Talbot, American paleontologist (b. 1869)
 July 21 – Rex Ingram, American director (b. 1892)
 July 22 – William Lyon Mackenzie King, Canadian political leader, 10th Prime Minister of Canada (b. 1874)
 July 24 – Zeffie Tilbury, English stage and film actress (b. 1863)
 July 27 – Marta Steinsvik, Norwegian author (b. 1877)
 July 28 – Kevin Budden, Australian amateur herpetologist (b. 1930)
 July 30 – Guilhermina Suggia, Portuguese cellist (b. 1885)

August

 August 3 
 Pierre-Émile Côté, Canadian politician (b. 1887)
 Kristian Laake, Norwegian general (b. 1875)
 August 6 – Francisco José Urrutia Olano, Colombian diplomat and jurist (b. 1870)
 August 8 – Nikolai Myaskovsky, Soviet composer (b. 1881)
 August 10 – Tadeusz Tomaszewski, 34th Prime Minister of Poland (b. 1881)
 August 19 
 Black Elk, Wičháša Wakȟáŋ (Medicine Man or Holy Man) of the Ogala Teton Lakota (Western Sioux) (b. 1863)
 Giovanni Giorgi, Italian physicist, engineer (b. 1871)
 August 22 – Kirk Bryan, American geologist (b. 1888)
 August 23 – Frank Phillips, American oil executive (b. 1873)
 August 24 
 Arturo Alessandri, Chilean politician, reformer and 3-time President of Chile (b. 1868)
 Vasily Gordov, Soviet general (executed) (b. 1896)
 Grigory Kulik, Soviet military officer, Marshal of the Soviet Union (executed) (b. 1890)
 August 25 – Giuseppe Grassi, Italian politician (b. 1883)
 August 26 
 Giuseppe De Luca, Italian baritone (b. 1876)
 Ransom E. Olds, American automotive pioneer (b. 1864)
 August 27 – Cesare Pavese, Italian poet, novelist (b. 1908)
 August 31 -- Pere Tarrés i Claret, Spanish Roman Catholic priest and blessed (b. 1905)

September

 September 4
 Max Davidson, German actor (b. 1875)
 Pieter Franciscus Dierckx, Belgian painter (b. 1871)
 September 6 – Olaf Stapledon, British author, philosopher (b. 1886)
 September 10 – Raymond Sommer, American race car driver (b. 1906)
 September 11
 Rudolph Palm, Curaçao-born composer (b. 1880)
 Jan Smuts, 2nd Prime Minister of South Africa (b. 1870)
 September 13 – Sara Allgood, Irish actress (b. 1880)
 September 15 
 Maraimalai Adigal, Indian orator, writer (b. 1876)
 Baldomero López, American hero of Korean War (b. 1925)
 September 16 
 Frederick Bennett, New Zealand Anglican bishop and reverend (b. 1871)
 Pedro de Cordoba, American actor (b. 1881)
 September 21 – Edward Arthur Milne, British astrophysicist, mathematician (b. 1896)
 September 23
 George Carlton, American actor (b. 1885)
 Kenneth Muir, British soldier, posthumous winner of the Victoria Cross (b.1912)
 September 29 – Alfréd Meissner, Czechoslovak politician, Holocaust survivor (b. 1871)
 September 30 – Prince Hubertus of Prussia (b. 1909)

October

 October 1 – Mikhail Rodionov, Soviet statesman, Leader of the Soviet Union (b. 1907)
 October 2 – John F. Fitzgerald, American politician, Mayor of Boston (b. 1863)
 October 5 – Thomas Addis Emmet, American-born Jamaican Roman Catholic bishop and reverend (b. 1873)
 October 9 – Nicolai Hartmann, German philosopher (b. 1882)
 October 11 – Pauline Lord, American actress (b. 1890)
 October 13 – Ernest Haycox, American writer (b. 1899)
 October 14 – António Maria da Silva, Portuguese politician, interim and 3-time Prime Minister of Portugal (b. 1872)
 October 18 – Giuseppe Borgatti, Italian tenor (b. 1871)
 October 19
 Edna St. Vincent Millay, American poet (b. 1892)
 Viktor Strazhev, Soviet bibliographer, translator, poet and literary critic (b. 1879)
 October 20 – Henry L. Stimson, United States Secretary of State (b. 1867)
 October 23 – Al Jolson, American musician, actor (The Jazz Singer) (b. 1886)
 October 25 – Yi Kwang-su, Korean writer, activist (b. 1891)
 October 26 – Miguel Mariano Gómez, Cuban politician, 7th President of Cuba (b. 1889)
 October 29
 Maurice Costello, American actor (b. 1877)
 King Gustaf V of Sweden (b. 1858)
 Lucien Martin, Canadian violinist, conductor and composer (b. 1908)
 October 30 – Raimundo Díaz Pacheco, Puerto Rican activist (b. 1906)
 October 31 – Giacomo Gorrini, Italian diplomat (b. 1859)

November

 November 2 – George Bernard Shaw, Irish writer, Nobel Prize laureate (b. 1856)
 November 3 – Kuniaki Koiso, Japanese general, 41st Prime Minister of Japan (b. 1880)
 November 4
 Grover Cleveland Alexander, American baseball player (Philadelphia Phillies), MLB Hall of Fame member (b. 1887)
 Francisca Herrera Garrido, Spanish writer (b. 1869)
 November 8 – Bernice Herstein, American socialite (b. 1918)
 November 9 – Attilio Andreoli, Italian painter (b. 1877)
 November 11
 Alexandros Diomidis, 152nd Prime Minister of Greece (b. 1875)
 Lúcio Alberto Pinheiro dos Santos, Portuguese philosopher, teacher (b. 1889)
 November 12
 Hryhorij Lakota, Soviet Eastern Catholic bishop and blessed (b. 1893)
 Julia Marlowe, English-born American stage actress (b. 1865)
 November 16 – Bob Smith, American doctor, physician and surgeon (b. 1879)
 November 17 – Virginia Fábregas, Mexican actress (b. 1871)
 November 23 – Abdul Hamid Karami, Lebanese political figure, religious leader and 16th Prime Minister of Lebanon (b. 1890)
 November 25
 Johannes V. Jensen, Danish writer, Nobel Prize laureate (b. 1873)
 Gustaf John Ramstedt, Finnish-born Swedish linguist, diplomat (b. 1873)
 November 27 – T. Sathasiva Iyer, Ceylon Tamil scholar, Tamil language writer (b. 1882)
 November 28 – James Corbitt, British murderer (hanged) (b. 1913)
 November 29
 Walter Beech, American pioneering aviator, aircraft manufacturer (b. 1891)
 Ma Zhanshan, Chinese general (b. 1885)
 November 30 – Werner Haase, Hitler's personal physician (b. 1900)

December

 December 2 
 James Fenton, Australian politician (b. 1864)
 Dinu Lipatti, Romanian pianist (b. 1917)
 December 4 – Jesse L. Brown, American aviator in the United States Navy (killed in action) (b. 1926)
 December 5 – Sri Aurobindo, Indian guru (b. 1872)
 December 11
 Ernst II, Prince of Hohenlohe-Langenburg, German prince (b. 1863)
 Leslie Comrie, New Zealand astronomer, computing pioneer (b. 1893)
 Juho Heiskanen, Finnish general (b. 1889)
 December 12 
 Luigi Biancheri, Italian admiral (b. 1891)
 Peter Fraser, New Zealand political figure, 24th Prime Minister of New Zealand, leader of World War II (b. 1884)
 December 15 – Vallabhbhai Patel, Indian political leader (b. 1875)
 December 20 – Enrico Mizzi, Maltese politician, 6th Prime Minister of Malta (b. 1885)
 December 22 – Walter Damrosch, German-born American conductor and composer (b. 1862)
 December 23 
 Francisco Lomuto, Argentine pianist, composer (b. 1893)
 Walton Walker, American general (b. 1889)
 December 25 – Xavier Villaurrutia, Mexican poet, playwright (b. 1903)
 December 26 – Liane de Pougy, French vedette and dancer (b. 1869)
 December 27 – Max Beckmann, German painter (b. 1884)
 December 30 – Mihail Manoilescu, Romanian journalist, engineer, economist, politician and memoirist (b. 1891)
 December 31 – Karl Renner, Austrian Social Democrat politician, 4th President of Austria (b. 1870)

Nobel Prizes

 Physics – Cecil Frank Powell
 Chemistry – Otto Paul Hermann Diels, Kurt Alder 
 Medicine – Edward Calvin Kendall, Tadeusz Reichstein, Philip Showalter Hench 
 Literature – Earl (Bertrand Arthur William) Russell
 Peace – Ralph Bunche

References